Polygrammodes rufinalis is a moth in the family Crambidae. It is found in Venezuela.

The wingspan is about 46 mm. Adults are brown with a pinkish tinge, the forewings with an indistinct dark antemedial line and a quadrate hyaline spot in the end of the cell and a wedge shaped spot beyond it. There is a dentate postmedial line with a brick-red area between it and the subterminal line. The hindwings have a quadrate hyaline spot in the cell and a wedge shaped spot beyond it. The area from the middle to the terminal band is brick-red.

References

Moths described in 1899
Spilomelinae
Moths of South America